Beijing Sport University (BSU), formerly known as "Central Institute of Physical Education" and "Beijing Institute of Physical Education", is a nation-level public university located in Beijing, China. It is one of the National Key Universities and also a Double First Class University Plan and former Project 211 University under direct leadership of the General Administration of Sport of China. Beijing Sport University is consistently ranked as the top institute for sport studies in China and enjoys prestigious reputation both at home and abroad. Lin Yi is currently studying in Beijing Sport University. In 2015, Beijing Sport University was ranked as an "elite university" with 6-star status by the CUAA. It is a Chinese state Double First Class University identified by the Ministry of Education.

History
BSU was founded in 1953 as the Central Institute of Physical Education. In 1960 the university was among the first batch of key national universities designated by the State Council. Situated in the Haidian District of Beijing, BSU covers a total area of approximately 1,400 acres, with a total construction area of approximately 600,000 square meters. BSU has a faculty of 1,027 with a current enrollment of 14,000 students with 8,265 undergraduates and 2,255 postgraduates. Beijing Sport University is the only university in China with the Category I discipline of sport science (a national key discipline) and is world-renowned for producing elite athletes. AS of 2015 BSU teachers and students have collectively won 73 gold medals in the Olympic Games.

BSU currently consists of eight schools and five departments: Graduate School, College of Physical Education, College of Sport Coaching, College of Wushu, College of Management, Sport Science College, College of Continuing Education, College of International Education, Sport Journalism and Communication Department, Foreign Languages Department, Sport and Arts Department, Sport Rehabilitation Department and Community Sport Department. It has two sport schools affiliated with it: the Sport High School and Secondary Technical School for Sport, plus three centers and two sections: Modern Education Technology Center, Sport Science Research Center, Teaching Laboratory Center, Teaching and Research Section for Ideological and Political Theory and the Periodical Section (Journal of Beijing Sport University). The Training Center of General Administration of Sport of China, the Coach Academy of General Administration of Sport of China and the Center for Sport Ethics and Anti-Corruption Studies of China are also located on campus.

The university is home to four national key academic disciplines, fourteen other key majors, five key laboratories at the provincial and ministerial level, one national key research center for sport sociology and humanities and a Beijing higher education research center at the provincial and ministerial level.  The university offers fourteen undergraduate programs in the areas of physical education, sport coaching, community sport, sport science, traditional Chinese sport, public affairs management, sport and industry management, journalism, advertisement, applied psychology, English, performance, dance performance, sport rehabilitation and leisure sport.

BSU has also provided a key platform for student-staff exchanges and distance education between China and the world and has established academic exchange relationships with about 79 universities from 34 countries and regions.

Undergraduate programs 
There are 39 undergraduate majors offered across 20 different colleges, covering a range of subjects in the humanities, sports science, education, the sciences, economic theory, and communications.

Sport Science College 
The Sport Science College ("SSC") of Beijing Sport University (BSU) was founded in 1958. Through nearly 50 years of development, the SSC has had seven departments: Department of Sport Physiology, Department of Sport Anatomy, Department of Sport Medicine, Department of Sport Biochemistry, Department of Sport Biomechanics, Department of Sport Psychology, Department of Sport Statistics and Physique Measurement, and The Experimentation Center and Rehabilitation Center which pertains to the SSC. In 2002, the National Ministry of Education approved the SSC's sport science program as the national key discipline, which means the preeminence in the national high education system. It is the only sport science college which has such an honor in China.

Programmes 
The SSC is the cradle of sport scientists of China. It is the first university that is authorized by the National Ministry of Education to confer a doctoral degree of sport science in China. There are three bachelor's degree programs (Sport Science, Sport Rehabilitation and Health, Sport Psychology), three master's degree programs (Sport Science, Sport Rehabilitation and Health, Sport Psychology) and one doctoral program (Sport Science).

The Sport Science program ranks No.1 in the counterpart universities of China. The SSC is one of very few universities in China that provides all the programs of BS, MA. and Ph.D. in sport science. 1102 bachelors, 350 masters and 55 doctors have graduated from SSC since it was founded. There are 400 undergraduate students and 150 graduate students now in SSC.

Research 
The research interests of the faculty involve all respects of sport science and health promotion. SSC faculty and students are charged with research projects for the national Olympic teams. BSU is pre-eminent in investigating the relationship between performance and incretion, elite athletes selection, hypoxic training, assessment of athlete performance, nutrition supplementation, bio-mechanical analysis of movement, sport injury prevention and rehabilitation, psychological training and recovery, exercise treatment and prevention of chronic diseases. SSC is the major undertaker of the National Physical Fitness Monitor (NPFM). In the last several decades it has focused on supervision and research of national physical fitness and has made great contribution to the establishment of National Physical Fitness Monitor.

See also 
 Beijing Sport University F.C.

References

Sports universities and colleges in China
Universities and colleges in Beijing
Educational institutions established in 1953
1953 establishments in China
Project 211